The 1999–2000 Connecticut Huskies women's basketball team represented the University of Connecticut (UConn) during the 1999–2000 NCAA Division I women's basketball season. The Huskies, led by Hall of Fame head coach Geno Auriemma in his 15th season at UConn, played their home games at Harry A. Gampel Pavilion and the Hartford Civic Center and were members of the Big East Conference. UConn finished the regular season with a record of 27–1 and went 16–0 in the Big East to win the regular season conference championship. They also won the Big East tournament. Then, they won the NCAA Tournament, defeating Tennessee in the final to win their second national championship.

Roster
Listed are the student athletes who were members of the 1999–2000 team.

Schedule

|-
!colspan=12 style=""| Regular Season

|-
!colspan=12 style=""|Big East tournament

|-
!colspan=12 style=""|NCAA tournament

Awards
 Geno Auriemma
 WBCA National Coach of the Year
 Naismith College Coach of the Year
 Associated Press College Basketball Coach of the Year
 Big East Conference Coach of the Year
 Shea Ralph
 Honda Sports Award for basketball
 NCAA basketball tournament Most Outstanding Player
 Big East Conference Women's Basketball Player of the Year

References

External links
 Official site

UConn Huskies women's basketball seasons
NCAA Division I women's basketball tournament Final Four seasons
Connecticut
Connecticut
Connect
Connect